Fenner is a leading British-based manufacturer of industrial belting and other polymer-based products. It is headquartered in Hessle. It was listed on the London Stock Exchange until it was acquired by Michelin in May 2018.

History
The business was founded by Joseph Henry Fenner in 1861 as a manufacturer of leather belting at Bishop Lane in Hull, England. In 1921 it diversified into textile belting and subsequently into polymer belting. In 2006 the Company initiated a major expansion in Ohio, United States.

In March 2018, French tyre maker, Michelin, launched a bid to buy the company for £1.3 billion. The acquisition was completed in May 2018.

Operations
The business is organised into the following units:
Engineered Conveyor Solutions
Advanced Engineered Products

References

External links
 Official site

Companies established in 1861
Companies based in the East Riding of Yorkshire
Manufacturing companies of the United Kingdom
Companies based in Kingston upon Hull
Industry in Kingston upon Hull
Companies formerly listed on the London Stock Exchange
1861 establishments in the United Kingdom